Olton Independent School District is a public school district based in Olton, Texas (USA).

Located in Lamb County and serving the cities of Olton and Spade, a portion of the district extends into Hale County.

Olton ISD has three campuses: Olton High (grades 9–12), Olton Junior High (grades 6–8), and H.P. Webb Elementary (grades PreK–5).

In 2009, the school district was rated "academically acceptable" by the Texas Education Agency.

History
In 1936 a school building was scheduled for construction.

On July 1, 2006, Spade Independent School District merged with Olton to form Olton ISD . Spade, formerly governed by Spade ISD, became governed by Olton ISD.

References

External links
Olton ISD

School districts in Lamb County, Texas
School districts in Hale County, Texas